The Kenny Noe Jr. Handicap is a thoroughbred horse race at Calder Race Course in Miami Gardens, Florida. It is a race on dirt over a distance of six and a half furlongs for horses age three and up.

The race was first run in 1975 as the Sunny Isle Handicap. Its name was changed for the 1995 running to honor Kenny Noe Jr., a former President of Calder Race course.

Winners

References

Calder Race Course
Horse races in Florida